James S. Cowan  (born January 22, 1942) is a Canadian lawyer, a senator from Nova Scotia from 2005 to 2017, and was Leader of the Opposition in the Senate from 2008 to 2015 and leader of the Independent Liberal caucus until June 15, 2016. A lawyer, Cowan has been a partner at the legal firm of Stewart McKelvey since 1967. He retired from the senate on January 22, 2017, having reached the mandatory retirement age for senators.

Education
He received a Bachelor of Arts degree and Bachelor of Law degree from Dalhousie University, where he was a member of Phi Delta Theta fraternity. He received his Master of Laws degree in 1966 from the London School of Economics.

Nova Scotia politics
In November 1985, Cowan announced he would seek the leadership of the Nova Scotia Liberal Party, but was defeated by Vince MacLean at the February 1986 leadership convention.

Senate
He was appointed to the Senate on the advice of prime minister Paul Martin on March 24, 2005 as a Liberal Party of Canada Senator. In 2008, he was appointed Leader of the Opposition in the Senate of Canada

In 2012, it was reported that Cowan and other Senate leaders allowed Senator Joyce Fairbairn to continue voting on legislative matters for four months after she was declared legally incompetent due to dementia caused by Alzheimer’s disease.

Leader of the Independent Senate Liberal Caucus
On January 29, 2014, Liberal Party leader Justin Trudeau announced all Liberal Senators, including Cowan, were removed from the Liberal caucus, and would continue sitting as Independents. The Senators continued to refer to themselves as the Senate Liberal Caucus even if they are no longer members of the parliamentary Liberal caucus. Liberal senators reaffirmed Cowan as their leader in 2014 through internal elections.

At the time that Trudeau removed Cowan and his fellow Liberal Senators from the Liberal caucus, Cowan's daughter Suzanne served as a senior advisor to Trudeau.

When the Liberal Party formed government following the 2015 federal election, new Prime Minister Justin Trudeau did not appoint Senator Cowan as Government Senate Leader. The position was replaced with the Representative of the Government in the Senate and assigned to independent Senator Peter Harder leaving Cowan as leader of the Independent Liberal caucus. Cowan stepped down as Liberal Senate Caucus leader on June 15, 2016. He retired from the Senate upon reaching the mandatory retirement age of 75 on January 22, 2017.

Family
Samuel Rettie is Cowan's great-great uncle.

References

External links
 

1942 births
Living people
Alumni of the London School of Economics
Canadian senators from Nova Scotia
Dalhousie University alumni
Schulich School of Law alumni
Lawyers in Nova Scotia
Liberal Party of Canada senators
Members of the United Church of Canada
People from Halifax, Nova Scotia
21st-century Canadian politicians
Members of the Order of Canada